The 1990 Argentina rugby union tour of British Isles was a series of eight matches played by the Argentina national rugby union team in October and November 1990. It was the first time that the Pumas played the Ireland and Scotland senior national teams, whereas they had previously played the England senior teams at Buenos Aires in 1981 and 1990.

Matches

 IRELAND "B": Wilkinson; Riordan, Clarke, Cunningham, Geoghegan; Barry, Bradley (capt.); Fitzgerald Kingston, Halpin; Potts, McBride; Lawlor, Lehay, Galwey.
ARGENTINA: A. Scolni; R. Romero Acuña, D. Cuesta Silva, S. Mesón, S. Ezcurra; H. Porta (capt.), G. Camardón; P. Garretón, A. Macome, E. Ezcurra; G. Llanes, J. Simes (33' F. Méndez); H. Ballatore, A. Cubelli, L. Lonardi .

IRISH STUDENTS: Hewitt; O’Dowd, Tormey, Glennon, Furlong; Barry, McIvor; Sheehan, Cronin, Devlin; O'Driscoll, O'Callaghan; Ward, Kenny, Leslie.ARGENTINA: G. Angaut (capt.); H. Vidou, M. Allen, H. García Simón, G. Jorge; L. Arbizu, R. Crexell; R. Villalonga, A. Macome, M. Bertranou; O. Fascioli (66' : J. Simes), P. Sporleder; H. Ballatore, R. Le Fort, F. Méndez.

EASTERN COUNTIES:  P. Larkin; R. Norcano, M. Thompson, I. Fox, R. Summer; J. King, B. Davies; R. Emblem (capt.), M. Pinnegar; G. Atherton (65' Easton); C. Pinnegar, M. Upex; W. Hallett, C. Newman, N. Prentice.ARGENTINA: G. Angaut (capt.); G. Romero Acuña, S. Mesón, M. Allen, H. Vidou; L. Arbizu, G. Camardón; E. Ezcurra, R. Etchegoyen, R. Villalonga; P. Fascioli, J. Simes; H. Ballatore, A. Cubelli, M. Aguirre.

SOUTH OF SCOTLAND: P. Dodds; H. Hogg, M. Wright, C. Redpath, M. Moncrieff; G. Shiel, G. Oliver; N. Ferguson, H. Hay, N. McIlroy; J. Laing, C. Hogg; A. Roxburgh, R. Kirpatrick; K. Armstrong. ARGENTINA: G. Angaut (capt.); D. Cuesta Silva, S. Mesón, M. Allen, G. Jorge; L. Arbizu, R. Crexell; E. Ezcurra, R. Etchegoyen (57' M. Bertranou), R. Villalonga; O. Fascioli (35' J. Simes), G. Llanes; D. Cash, A. Cubelli, M. Aguirre.

 Barbarians: Simon Hodgkinson; Ieuan Evans, Craig Innes, Mark Ring, Keith Crossan; Craig Chalmers, Robert Jones (capt.); Gareth Rees, Phil Davies, Richard Webster; Chris Gray, Ian Jones; P. Knight, T. Kingston, L. Hullena. Argentina: G. Angaut (capt.); D. Cuesta Silva, S. Mesón, M. Allen, G. Jorge; L. Arbizu, G. Camardón; R. Villalonga, R. Etchegoyen, P. Garretón (34' A. Macome); P. Sporleder, G. Llanes; D. Cash, R. Le Fort, M. Aguirre.

References

Sources

1990
1990
1990
1990
History of rugby union matches between Argentina and England
History of rugby union matches between Argentina and Ireland
tour
1990–91 in British rugby union
1990–91 in Irish rugby union
1990–91 in English rugby union
1990–91 in Scottish rugby union